Franklinville Historic District is a national historic district located at Franklinville, Randolph County, North Carolina. The district encompasses 137 contributing buildings, 1 contributing site, and 5 contributing structures in the central business district and surrounding residential sections of Franklinville.  It includes buildings built between about 1819 and the late 1920s and notable examples of Victorian and Greek Revival architecture. Notable buildings include the Franklinville Manufacturing Company complex, Johnson-Julian House (c. 1819), Horney-Curtis-Buie House (c. 1830), a group of antebellum mill houses (c. 1838), Madison Brower House (c. 1840), Hanks Lodge (1850), Frazier-Fentress House (c. 1890), Franklinville Methodist Church (1912-1913), Grove Hotel (1915-1919), and Franklinville Store Company (1920).

It was added to the National Register of Historic Places in 1984.

References

Historic districts on the National Register of Historic Places in North Carolina
Victorian architecture in North Carolina
Greek Revival architecture in North Carolina
Buildings and structures in Randolph County, North Carolina
National Register of Historic Places in Randolph County, North Carolina